Wayne Ough (born 27 November 1978) is an Australian former professional baseball pitcher who also competed in the Olympics.

Drafted by the New York Mets in the 15th round of the 2000 Major League Baseball draft, Ough spent five seasons in the minor leagues, from 2000 to 2004. He then competed in the Can-Am League, an independent baseball league, during 2005 and 2006, and in the Australian Baseball League in 2010, 2011, and 2014.

Ough played in the Czech Baseball Extraliga during three seasons. In 2009 and 2010 for Draci Brno and in 2011 for Technika Brno.

In 2004, Ough was part of the Australian Olympic baseball team that earned a silver medal in the baseball tournament at the Athens Olympics. He pitched in three games without allowing an earned run.

References

External links

1978 births
Living people
Adelaide Bite players
Australian expatriate baseball players in Canada
Australian expatriate baseball players in the United States
Baseball pitchers
Baseball players at the 2004 Summer Olympics
Binghamton Mets players
Brockton Rox players
Brooklyn Cyclones players
Capital City Bombers players
Draci Brno players
Kingsport Mets players
Medalists at the 2004 Summer Olympics
Olympic baseball players of Australia
Olympic silver medalists for Australia
Olympic medalists in baseball
Québec Capitales players
St. Lucie Mets players
People from Werribee, Victoria
Sportspeople from Melbourne
Sportsmen from Victoria (Australia)